Branchiostegus australiensis, the Australian tilefish, is a species of marine ray-finned fish, a tilefish belonging to the family Malacanthidae. It is found in the Indo-West Pacific, from off of Sumatra, Indonesia to Shark Bay, in Western Australia.

References

Malacanthidae
Taxa named by James Keith Dooley
Taxa named by Patricia J. Kailola
Fish described in 1988